The Katara Pass or Metsovo Pass is a mountain pass in the Pindus mountains in northern Greece. It is 5 km northeast of the town Metsovo. Situated on the border of Epirus (Ioannina regional unit) and Thessaly (Trikala regional unit), it forms the divide between the river basins of the Aoos to the southwest and the Pineios to the east. Its elevation is about  making it one of the highest in the nation. The Greek National Road 6 (Larissa - Trikala - Metsovo - Ioannina - Igoumenitsa) crosses the Katara Pass. With the opening of the Egnatia Odos motorway which passes through tunnels further south, traffic has sharply declined.

External links
 Pictures of the Katara Pass

Mountain passes of Greece
Landforms of Ioannina (regional unit)
Landforms of Trikala (regional unit)
Landforms of Epirus (region)
Landforms of Thessaly